Sankt Pelagiberg is a village in the canton of Thurgau, Switzerland.

The village is located in the former municipality Gottshaus. In 1996, Gottshaus municipality merged with its neighbor to form a new and larger municipality, Hauptwil-Gottshaus.

References

Villages in Switzerland